Bhoot – Part One: The Haunted Ship ("bhoot" being ghost in Hindi) is a 2020 Indian Hindi-language horror thriller film written and directed by Bhanu Pratap Singh  and jointly produced by Karan Johar, Hiroo Yash Johar, Apoorva Mehta, and Shashank Khaitan. The film features Vicky Kaushal in lead role and is the first film of what was a planned horror film franchise.

Movies director and producer claimed that film is based on a true incident that took place in Mumbai, the famous MV Wisdom in 2011 and tells the story of an officer who has to move an abandoned but haunted ship lying static on Juhu Beach. Principal photography began in December 2018 and was wrapped in September 2019.

Set for an initial release on 15 November 2019, the film was postponed and released theatrically in India on 21 February 2020. It eventually received negative reviews and was a commercial failure.

Plot
Meera's third birthday is celebrated on the Sea-Bird by the ship's merchant crew. Drawn away from the party by a sound, Meera is attacked by a ghost and screams. Years later, shipping officer Prithvi Maurya (Vicky Kaushal), with the help of friend and colleague Riaz, elopes with his pregnant girlfriend Sapna. Prithvi foils a human trafficking operation but Riaz warns him against such dangerous adventures. Prithvi and Sapna give birth to a baby girl, Megha, and are shown raising her.

Sometime later, Prithvi is living alone. He and Riaz investigate the Sea-Bird, which was mysteriously found abandoned at an unmanned port, and recover its logbook. A couple is shown having a romantic adventure on the ship before being killed by a ghost. The body of a girl is found buried on the beach. Prithvi and Riaz attempt to tow the Sea-Bird for disposal, but their salvage ship is damaged. Prithvi is injured saving a drowning man and sees a girl through a hole in the ship.

While recovering, Prithvi hallucinates of the ship and his wife and daughter. In a flashback, it is revealed that they drowned due to improper safety equipment on a river-rafting vacation he had planned. Disturbed, he consults with Professor Joshi (Ashutosh Rana), who is researching the afterlife and has hallucinations of his own dead wife and daughter. Prithvi returns to the ship and finds a video camera in the engine room; the ghost attacks him but he is saved by Riaz.

Prithvi comes to believe that the girl he saw is Meera and that she has been possessed by the ghost for 11 years. He brings his findings to Joshi who advises him to identify the ghost; Riaz is wary, knowing this is well beyond their duty. Prithvi learns that the crew of the ship committed suicide, except for Meera and her mother, and grows suspicious of an unidentified man amongst the crew. Prithvi and Riaz meet the mother, Vandana (Meher Vij), and play the video of Meera's birthday party. Vandana reveals that the Sea-Bird was involved in drug smuggling and other illegal activities and that the unknown man, Amar, stopped her from committing suicide after the captain had assaulted her.  Vandana says that she and Amar fell in love and planned to flee, recording the captain's illegal activities to expose him, but that Amar was caught and died following torture.

In order to free Meera, Vandana agrees to show the shipping officers a secret room on the ship.  Along with Joshi, they go to the ship the night before it is to be towed away. They fight the ghost, and during the encounter, it is revealed that Vandana killed Amar to save herself. Vandana and Joshi are killed, and Riaz spills the diesel fuel. Prithvi finds the secret room where Amar's corpse is hanging. He burns the body, dispelling the ghost. Prithvi rescues Meera and they escape through the hole in the ship.

In the epilogue, Prithvi teaches Meera how to eat noodles.  In an additional scene in the mid-credits, a black figure is seen moving around Prithvi's home.

Cast
Vicky Kaushal as Prithvi Maurya
Bhumi Pednekar as Sapna Prakashan
Inayah Chowdhry as Meera
Akash Dhar  as Riaz
Ashutosh Rana as Professor Raghuveer Joshi
Siddhanth Kapoor as Captain Siddharth Roy
Meher Vij as Vandana
Priya Chauhan as Nilofer

Production
In January 2018, it was reported that Kaushal and Pednekar had signed to perform in a horror film produced by Karan Johar. The filming began in December 2018, with Kaushal, while Pednekar filmed her portions in late January. Kaushal fractured his cheekbone while shooting for an action sequence in Gujarat. A door fell on him which resulted in him getting 13 stitches. The shooting of the film ended on 3 September 2019 according to a message on Kaushal's Instagram account.

Release
The film was initially set for release on 15 November 2019, but this was delayed and until 21 February 2020.

Soundtrack

The film has only one song, composed and written by Akhil Sachdeva.

Box office
Bhoot – Part One: The Haunted Ship earned 5.10 crore (51 million rupees) net at the domestic box office on its opening day. On the second day, the film collected ₹5.52 crore. On the third day, the film collected ₹5.74 crores taking the total opening weekend collection to ₹16.36 crores (163.6 million rupees).

, with a gross of 38.06 crore in India and 2.88 crore overseas, the film has a worldwide gross collection of 40.94 crore (409.4 million rupees).

Critical reception 

Namrata Joshi of The Hindu wrote that the film "floats along swimmingly and perches promisingly well at the interval till the curse of the second half gets to afflict it severely." Ronak Kotecha of The Times of India gave the film 2.5 stars out of 5 stating that the film "isn’t convincing enough to make your wait worth it. For a horror film, ‘Bhoot Part One the Haunted Ship’ falls short of sending chills down your spine. At best, it can give you a few spooks." Udita Jhunjhunwala of Firstpost also gave it 2.5 stars adding : "The parallels between Prithvi’s trauma and the tragedy onboard the Sea Bird are far from subtle and that is Bhoot’s greatest loss – it floats but does not find its emotional anchor in the deep and haunting impact of personal loss and regret."

Shalini Langer of gave it 1.5 stars out of 5 and stated that "Vicky Kaushal is the saving grace of this horror film." Writing in Hindustan Times, Monika Rawal Kukreja described the film as "The best you can say about Bhoot is that it is not outrageously funny as some of Ram Gopal Varma’s big-screen outings, but does unintentionally crack you up at many places."
Vibha Maru of India Today gave it 1 star out of 5 and called it "mind-numbingly boring."

References

External links

2020s ghost films
2020s Hindi-language films
2020 horror thriller films
2020 films
Films set on ships
Indian ghost films
Indian horror thriller films
Indian supernatural horror films